Sceloporus melanorhinus, the pastel tree lizard, black-nosed lizard, or southern black-nosed lizard, is a species of lizard in the family Phrynosomatidae. It is found in Mexico and Guatemala.

References

Sceloporus
Reptiles of Mexico
Reptiles of Guatemala
Reptiles described in 1876
Taxa named by Marie Firmin Bocourt